

The Klemm Kl 105 was a two-seat sport aircraft developed in Germany in 1938. It was a low-wing cantilever monoplane of conventional design with fixed, tailskid undercarriage, and side-by-side seating for two within an enclosed cockpit. Construction throughout was of wood, with the fuselage built using a new semi-monocoque technique which Klemm patented. Plans to produce the design in series were abandoned with the outbreak of the Second World War.

Development
In January 1937 Major Werner Junck, chief of the LC II, the technical wing of the Reichsluftfahrtministerium responsible for the development of new aircraft, informed various minor aircraft manufacturers such as Bücker, Fieseler, Gothaer Waggonfabrik, Flugzeugwerke Halle and Klemm that they would not get any contracts for the development of military aircraft. He therefore advised them to concentrate in the development of a Volksflugzeug or a small twin-engined plane. As a result, Klemm developed the Kl 105, while the other companies produced the Fi 253, the Si 202, the Bü 180 and the Go 150.

Specifications

References
Notes

Bibliography
 
 
 

1930s German sport aircraft
Klemm aircraft
Single-engined tractor aircraft
Low-wing aircraft
Aircraft first flown in 1938